Bibifoc (Seabert) is a 1985 French animated television series. It was created by BZZ Films in Paris and originally aired in French on Antenne 2, before being translated into different languages around the world. In the United States, the show aired on HBO starting in 1987. There were 26 episodes. The authors are: Marc Tortarolo for the theme, Philippe Marin for the design, and Jacques Morel with Éric Turlot for the stories.

Development
The production for the series was handled by Mill Valley Animation on a contract from SEPP International S.A., the noted Brussels's production house which also featured animation series and properties including The Smurfs, Snorks and Foofur. Jerry Smith, owner of Mill Valley Animation, was also responsible for many of the below the line fulfillment needs of many Hanna-Barbera, Ruby-Spears, and some DIC animation series. Director for Seabert was Dirk Braat of Amsterdam and series Casting Director was Ron Knight, principal of Knight Mediacom (formerly Image One Productions, San Francisco). See Knight Mediacom International.

Plot
Seabert is about a boy named Tommy, an Inuit girl named Aura, and their "pet" whitecoat seal Seabert. After Seabert's parents are killed by hunters, the three band together. They go on adventures in which they encounter more hunters and poachers (including Tommy's Uncle Smokey, his bumbling henchmen Carbonne and Sulfuric, and a villain named Graphite) and save various animals from harm.

Episode list

Music
 Theme of the Smokey's Gang - Ol' Soft Shoe by Network Music Ensemble
 Smokey's Gang Hijinks - That's All Folks! by Network Music Ensemble

See also
 List of French animated television series
 List of French television series

References

External links
 
 Seabert: The Adventure Begins

1985 French television series debuts
French children's animated adventure television series
Fictional pinnipeds
Animated television series about mammals
1980s French animated television series